is a Japanese romantic comedy light novel series written by Haruki Kuō and illustrated by konomi. Media Factory has published the series since April 2019 under their MF Bunko J imprint. A manga adaptation with art by Funa Yukina has been serialized in Media Factory's seinen manga magazine Monthly Comic Alive since August 2019. An anime television series adaptation by Geek Toys is set to premiere in July 2023.

Characters

Media

Light novel
The series is written by Haruki Kuō and illustrated by konomi. Media Factory published the series under their MF Bunko J imprint. They have published twelve volumes since April 2019. The light novel is licensed by Yen Press for English publication.

Manga
A manga adaptation with art by Funa Yukina has been serialized in Media Factory's seinen manga magazine Monthly Comic Alive since August 2019. It has been collected in two tankōbon volumes.

Anime
An anime adaptation was announced on April 1, 2021, which is April Fool's Day. It was later revealed to be a television series produced by Geek Toys and directed by Satoru Ono and Naoki Matsuura, with scripts written by Momoka Toyoda, character designs handled by Yumi Nakamura, and music composed by Kuniyuki Takahashi and Keiichi Hirokawa from Monaca. The series is set to premiere in July 2023 on Tokyo MX and other networks.

References

External links
 
 

2019 Japanese novels
2023 anime television series debuts
Anime and manga based on light novels
Geek Toys
Kadokawa Dwango franchises
Light novels
Media Factory manga
MF Bunko J
Romantic comedy anime and manga
Seinen manga
Upcoming anime television series
Yen Press titles